William Miller (1890 – after 1924) was an English professional footballer who made seven appearances in the English Football League for Brighton & Hove Albion. Before Brighton's admission to the Football League, Miller scored 40 goals from 84 games in the Southern League and 11 goals from 12 games in the Southern Alliance, and was their top scorer in the 1913–14 season with 20 goals in all competitions. He was born in Alnwick, Northumberland, and played as an inside forward.

References

1890 births
Date of birth missing
Year of death missing
People from Alnwick
Footballers from Northumberland
Place of death missing
English footballers
Association football inside forwards
Brighton & Hove Albion F.C. players
Hove United F.C. players
Redhill F.C. players
Shoreham F.C. players
Southern Football League players
English Football League players